Thanasis Paleologos (Greek: Θανάσης Παλαιολόγος; born 14 July 1977) is a Greek professional football defender who plays for Iraklis Psachna in the Football League (Greece).

Career
Born in Chalcis, Paleologos began playing football with Iraklis Psachna F.C. in the regional league. He signed a professional contract with AEL in 2001.

References
Profile at epae.org
Profile at Onsports.gr

1977 births
Living people
Greek footballers
Athlitiki Enosi Larissa F.C. players
Veria F.C. players
Panetolikos F.C. players
Ethnikos Asteras F.C. players
Association football defenders
Footballers from Chalcis